Union Namur, commonly known as UR Namur or Union Royale Namur, is a Belgian football club from the city of Namur. It plays in the second amateur division. They are often nicknamed "Les Merles" due to their colours black with a touch of yellow. 

Until 2018, the team was known as UR Namur, however as the team faced relegation from the 2017–18 Belgian Third Amateur Division into the Belgian provincial leagues, the team instead merged with newly promoted Fosses to form Union Royale Namur Fosses-La-Ville and retain its place in the Belgian Third Amateur Division.

In 2021-2022 the renamed Union Namur promotes to the Second Amateur Division (4th national level).

Ground
Stade communal de Namur (City of Namur Stadium). Capacity : about 3 500 (700 seats).

Players

Retired numbers
3 –  Michel Soulier, defender (1967–77)

Staff
Head Coach
 Cédric Fauré

Assistant Coach
 Pierre Salmé

Goalkeeper Coach
 Baudouin Leclercq

References

External links
  
  UR Namur Fans

Football clubs in Belgium
Association football clubs established in 1905
1905 establishments in Belgium
UR Namur